Matthew Savoie (born September 12, 1980, in Peoria, Illinois), is an American former competitive figure skater. He is a three-time U.S. bronze medalist, the 2006 Four Continents bronze medalist, and competed at the 2006 Olympics.

Skating career 
Matthew Savoie first gained prominence when he won the gold medal on the junior level at the 1997 U.S. Championships. He went on to place in the top five at every U.S. Nationals between 1999 and 2006, winning bronze medals in 2001, 2004, and 2006 and pewter medals (fourth place) in 1999, 2000, 2002, and 2005.

Savoie won bronze medals at the ISU Junior Grand Prix Final, the Grand Prix Final, and the World Junior Championships. He represented the United States three times at the World Championships.

Savoie was the first alternate to the 2002 Olympic team. In 2004, he underwent knee surgery due to parallel tendonitis. By winning the bronze at the 2006 U.S. Championships, Savoie earned a chance to compete at the 2006 Winter Olympics. He finished seventh overall.

Savoie was raised in Peoria, Illinois, and trained there with coach Linda Branan throughout his career. He also worked with coach Gene Heffron, choreographer Tom Dickson, and modern dance teacher Kathy Johnson.

In July 2006, Savoie was appointed as the athlete representative to the Single & Pair Skating Technical Committee of the International Skating Union. He completed a four-year term.

Personal life and post-competitive career 
Savoie graduated from Peoria High School (Peoria, Illinois) in 1998. He graduated summa cum laude from Bradley University in 2002, with a major in political science and a minor in biology. He went on to earn his master's degree in urban planning from the University of Illinois at Urbana-Champaign College of Fine & Applied Arts in 2005 and received the AICP Outstanding Graduate Student Award for 2005. He was admitted to the law school at Cornell University in 2005, but obtained a deferral for a year to focus on making the Olympic team. He joined the program in September 2006, where he also served as secretary of the LAMBDA (LGBT) Law Students Association. After graduating in 2009, Savoie worked as an associate at Choate Hall & Stewart law firm before leaving in 2014 to become a coach at The Skating Club of Boston. His students include Curran Oi.

Savoie married attorney Brian Boyle on October 7, 2012, in Sturbridge, Massachusetts.

Programs

Competitive highlights

References

External links 

 Matthew Savoie at U.S. Figure Skating
 

1980 births
American male single skaters
Bradley University alumni
Figure skaters at the 2006 Winter Olympics
Living people
Olympic figure skaters of the United States
Sportspeople from Peoria, Illinois
Gay sportsmen
LGBT figure skaters
LGBT people from Illinois
American LGBT sportspeople
University of Illinois College of Fine and Applied Arts alumni
Four Continents Figure Skating Championships medalists
World Junior Figure Skating Championships medalists